The 1958 Japan Series was the Nippon Professional Baseball (NPB) championship series for the 1958 season. It was the ninth Japan Series and featured the Pacific League champions, the Nishitetsu Lions, against the Central League champions, the Yomiuri Giants.

Summary

Matchups

Game 1
Saturday, October 11, 1957 – 1:35 pm at Korakuen Stadium in Bunkyō, Tokyo

Game 2
Sunday, October 12, 1957 – 1:30 pm at Korakuen Stadium in Bunkyō, Tokyo

Game 3
Tuesday, October 14, 1957 – 2:02 pm at Heiwadai Stadium in Fukuoka, Fukuoka Prefecture

Game 4
Thursday, October 16, 1957 – 2:01 pm at Heiwadai Stadium in Fukuoka, Fukuoka Prefecture

Game 5
Friday, October 17, 1957 – 2:05 pm at Heiwadai Stadium in Fukuoka, Fukuoka Prefecture

Game 6
Monday, October 20, 1957 – 2:10 pm at Korakuen Stadium in Bunkyō, Tokyo

Game 7
Tuesday, October 21, 1957 – 1:33 pm at Korakuen Stadium in Bunkyō, Tokyo

See also
1958 World Series

References

Japan Series
Japan Series
Japan Series
Japan series